Christophe Lestrade (born October 27, 1969, in Bordeaux) is a former professional footballer who played as a defensive midfielder.

References

External links
Christophe Lestrade profile at chamoisfc79.fr

1969 births
Living people
French footballers
Association football midfielders
FC Girondins de Bordeaux players
Toulouse FC players
En Avant Guingamp players
Paris Saint-Germain F.C. players
LB Châteauroux players
Chamois Niortais F.C. players
ÉFC Fréjus Saint-Raphaël players
Ligue 2 players